Élise Thiers (1818–1880) was the wife of the President of France Adolphe Thiers.

She was the daughter of a banker. She married Thiers in 1833. Prior and after their marriage, Thiers had a relationship with her mother Eurydice and her sister Felice. This became a topic of gossip and slander during the presidency of her spouse, when her sister Felice resided with them and performed the representational duties by her side. Élise Thiers was regarded to be stingy. She accompanied her spouse on diplomatic dinners and demonstrated her economic sensibility by going herself to the market in Versailles.

References

1818 births
1880 deaths
Spouses of French presidents